This article provides details of international football games played by the Cape Verde national football team from 2020 to present.

Results

2020

2021

2022

Forthcoming fixtures
The following matches are scheduled:

References

Football in Cape Verde
Cape Verde national football team results